was a village located in Kamo District, Shizuoka Prefecture, Japan.

As of 2005, the village had an estimated population of 3,291 and a density of 83 persons per km². The total area was 39.64 km².

On April 1, 2005, Kamo was merged into the expanded town of Nishiizu and thus no longer exists as an independent municipality.

Points of interest
 Atagawa Tropical & Alligator Garden
 Shimokamo Tropical Botanical Gardens

External links
 Nishiizu official website 
 Izu area tourism website 

Dissolved municipalities of Shizuoka Prefecture
Nishiizu, Shizuoka